Phillips High School was a public high school in Phillips, Wisconsin. The original three-story block was built in 1907 and the Public Works Administration added the gymnasium section in 1937. The building was added to the National Register of Historic Places in 1995.

History
The building stopped being used as a high school in 1972 after the construction of a new one. It now serves as an apartment building.

References

School buildings on the National Register of Historic Places in Wisconsin
Defunct schools in Wisconsin
Apartment buildings in Wisconsin
Modern Movement architecture in the United States
Buildings and structures in Price County, Wisconsin
National Register of Historic Places in Price County, Wisconsin